Faryal Gohar is a Pakistan actress, television writer and human rights activist. She is known for her roles in dramas Waris, Uraan, Chaandni Raatain, Chand Grehan, Wisal and Mohini Mansion Ki Cinderellayain.

Early life
Faryal was born on 18 December 1959, in Lahore, Pakistan. She attended Lahore American School, she enjoyed playing sports and she played softball eventually she became the captain of softball in her school. Then she went to Kinnaird College there she took part in sports. Later she went to Canada to study political economy and studied at McGill University. After graduating from McGill University, she went to America and she attend University of Southern California at Los Angeles and she studied film documentary.

Career
Faryal made her debut as an actress on PTV in 1979. She appeared in drama Traffik with her husband Jamal Shah. Then she appeared in dramas Uraan, Chand Grehan and Chaandni Raatain.

In 1984, she established the Fine Arts Department at the University of Balochistan. She also appeared in telefilm Gul Phenke Hein as Jahanara Faryal joined Ajoka Theatre which was founded by her sister Madeeha and she did theatre from 1980s till 1990s, she did many staged plays.

Faryal was appointed as UNFPA Goodwill Ambassador for the United Nations Population Fund in 1999.

In 2013 she appeared in movie Zar Gul as Yasmin and in 2014 she appeared in movie Tamanna as Madame Fatima. Then she appeared in drama Mohini Mansion Ki Cinderellayain as Daaro Maasi along with actress Shabnam and Qavi Khan.

In 2018 she was appointed as Goodwill Cancer Care Ambassador by Cancer Care Hospital & Research Center.

Faryal was appointd as Goodwill Softball Ambassador by Federation of Pakistan president Haider Khan Lehri in 2019.

Personal life
Faryal married actor Jamal Shah but after some years later they divorced. Faryal married a Pakistani doctor in California in America but it also ended in divorced. Faryal's elder sister actress Madeeha Gauhar died in 2018. Faryal is the aunt of actress Savera Nadeem and sister-in-law to screenwriter Shahid Nadeem.

Filmography

Television

Telefilm

Film

Music video

Ambassadorship
 UNFPA Goodwill Ambassador in 1999
 Ambassador for Cancer Care in 2018
 Pakistan softball Ambassador in 2019

Awards and nominations

Bibliography
Faryal authored a critically novel titled The Scent of Wet Earth in August about exploration of desire and loss set in present day. Then she wrote another book titled No Space for Further Burials mentioning concerns about the socio-political situation.

References

External links
 

1959 births
20th-century Pakistani writers
Living people
20th-century novelists
20th-century Pakistani actresses
Urdu-language writers from Pakistan
20th-century Pakistani women writers
21st-century Pakistani writers
Pakistani television actresses
21st-century Pakistani women writers
Urdu-language writers
21st-century Pakistani actresses
Pakistani film actresses
Pakistani stage actresses
Pakistani novelists
Pakistani women's rights activists
21st-century novelists
Women dramatists and playwrights
Pakistani dramatists and playwrights
20th-century dramatists and playwrights
Writers from Lahore
21st-century dramatists and playwrights
Actresses from Lahore